Carystina is a genus of skippers in the family Hesperiidae.

Species
Recognised species in the genus Carystina include:
 Carystina discors Plötz, 1882
 Carystina lysiteles Mabille, 1891

References

Hesperiinae
Hesperiidae genera